The German-Malaysian Institute (GMI) is the German-Malaysian educational institute in Malaysia.

It was located at Taman Shamelin Perkasa, Cheras, Kuala Lumpur but has moved to the new campus in Jalan Ilmiah, Taman Universiti, 43000 Kajang, Selangor.

GMI started its first student enrollment in 1992.

History
German-Malaysian Institute (GMI) was established in 1991. It is a centre for advanced skills training that offers courses with hands-on practical and theory in the fields of Mechanical Engineering and Electrical Engineering.

The formation of GMI is a result of a joint venture project between the governments of Malaysia and Germany. It is governed by a board of directors composed of ten representatives from the industry and also the government bodies. This institution is set up as a Company Limited by Guarantee where the founders are Majlis Amanah Rakyat (MARA) and the Malaysian-German Chamber of Commerce & Industry (MGCC). GMI had its first student enrolment in 1992 and the number continues to grow until now.

Services
GMI offers 3-year full-time diploma programs in Electrical Engineering (Electronics & IT, Mechatronics, Process Instrumentation & Control, Network Security, Sustainable Energy and Power Distribution, Industrial Plant Maintenance) & Mechanical Engineering (Mould, Tool & Die, Product Design & Manufacturing, CNC, Sheet Metal Fabrication & Product Development, Manufacturing System), German University Preparatory Program (GAPP) and Technical Teacher Training Program. Other services include short-term technology-related courses, industrial projects and consultancy.

GMI has graduated students in various fields namely design, manufacture, operation, maintenance, fault analysis and complex production plant repair, machinery, equipment, tools and manufactured products.

Facilities

Sport Complex
The indoor complex consists of five multipurpose courts for takraw, basketball and badminton, alongside the futsal and squash courts.
For outdoor games like tennis, netball, basketball and volleyball, courts are located on the peripheries of the complex. Adjacent to the main complex is a soccer field with roofed grandstand and seats.

Mass Sitting
Part of GMI amenities include mass-sitting facilities to cater for the growing number of students and staff, and for a variety of occasions. Amongst the facilities are the Feisol Hassan-Halle (GMI Hall); an auditorium and two lecture halls.
Standing significantly in the centre of the training compound and with a hemispherical roof atop it is Dewan Gemilang Mercu. This hall accommodates up to a maximum of 3,000 pax in a theatre layout and a maximum of 600 pax in a banquet setting, at any one time.

Accommodation
GMI admission offers new students accommodation (subject to availability). Students are given the option and are encouraged to stay in the hostel. The hostel is located within the campus which is gated and guarded 24-hours a day.
There are 6 high-rise elevated hostel blocks that can accommodate 3,010 students at any one time.

Academics

Departments

Department of Electrical Engineering (EED)

Diploma in Engineering Technology 
 Mechatronics
 Process Instrumentation & Control
 Electronics & Information Technology
 Network Security
 Sustainable Energy & Power Distribution
 Industrial Plant Maintenance
 Building Automation & Facilities
 Industrial Communication System
 Autotronics & Hybrid System
 Creative Multimedia
 Software Testing

Department of Mechanical Engineering (MED)

Diploma in Engineering Technology 
 Mould Technology
 Tool & Die Technology
 Product Design & Manufacturing
 CNC Precision Technology
 Manufacturing System
 Sheet Metal Fabrication & Product Development
 Industrial Design
 Machine Tool Maintenance
 Jigs & Fixtures Design and Manufacturing
 Industrial Quality Management

German University Preparatory Programmes 
 German University Preparatory Programme (GAPP)

Partner Institutions 
 Australia
Australian National University
 Germany
Mannheim University of Applied Sciences
 Malaysia
Universiti Teknologi Petronas

See also 
 Germany–Malaysia relations

References

External links 
 

Kajang
Cambridge schools in Malaysia
Colleges in Malaysia
Engineering universities and colleges in Malaysia
Technical universities and colleges in Malaysia
Universities and colleges in Selangor
Educational institutions established in 1991
1991 establishments in Malaysia
Germany–Malaysia relations